The German National Association of Senior Citizens' Organizations (German: Bundesarbeitsgemeinschaft der Seniorenorganisationen or BAGSO) is an umbrella organization of about 120 civil society organizations, which together represent several million older people. BAGSO is a Nonprofit organization based in Bonn and it was founded in 1989.

Chairpersons 
 1989 to 1996: Marieluise Kluge-Steudel
 1996 to 2006: Roswitha Verhülsdonk
 2006 to 2009: Walter Link
 2009 to 2015: Ursula Lehr
 2015 to 2021: Franz Müntefering
 since 2021: Regina Görner

International Commitment 
On an international level, BAGSO is committed to strengthening the rights of older people worldwide, advocating for a UN convention on the rights of older people. To this end, BAGSO participates in the debate on how to better protect the rights of older people worldwide, in particular in the Open-ended Working Group on Ageing of the United Nations. 

At the European level, BAGSO is part of the European Economic and Social Committee (EESC) and is a member of AGE Platform Europe, the umbrella association of older people's organizations in Europe.

See also
 German Senior Citizens' Day
 United Nations Economic and Social Council
 Second World Assembly on Ageing
 Federal Ministry of Family Affairs, Senior Citizens, Women and Youth

References

External links
 Official Website

Gerontology organizations
Lobbying organizations in Europe
Political advocacy groups in Germany